All My Life is a 2020 American romantic drama film directed by Marc Meyers, from a screenplay by Todd Rosenberg, based on the true story of Solomon Chau and Jennifer Carter, a young couple that rushes to put their wedding together after Solomon is diagnosed with liver cancer. The film stars Jessica Rothe, Harry Shum Jr., Kyle Allen, Chrissie Fit, Jay Pharoah, Marielle Scott, and Keala Settle.

The film was theatrically released in the United Kingdom on October 23, 2020, and in the United States on December 4, 2020, by Universal Pictures. Critics praised the performances and chemistry of the leads, but noted the film as cliché.

Plot
Based on a true story, Jenn and her friends decide to stop at a bar to have a few beers before dinner. They then run into Sol and his friends over a short discussion of UFC and embarrassing pickup lines to get a girl. After a few conversations over beer, Sol and Jenn start a seamless relationship. They then decide to live together so Sol can pursue his passion of being a chef after Sol expresses how working where he is currently isn't what he wants to do. After analyzing bills that are piling up, he decides to stay at work.

The couple host friendsgiving and Sol starts to feel weird but ignores it. He whispers to Jen over a thank you toast to the friends and family that he put in his two weeks notice. Later in the season, he decides to propose to Jen with their family and friends singing their favorite song "Don’t Look Back in Anger" by Oasis. Sol starts working at Jenn's cousin's successful restaurant.

One night, Sol wakes up in pain, screaming to Jen that something is wrong. They find out that Sol has a tumor and he reassures Jen that everything will be okay once the doctors get rid of it. Sol suggests to Jen if the news is bad, they should get a dog. After getting the lab work back from the doctor, he tells them that everything is fine and that the labs are good. They decide to continue planning the wedding and Sol returns back to the restaurant with his dish on the menu. One day, Sol texts Jen telling her to come home. He greets her with a dog named Otis, and after a month or two, his cancer has progressed and he needs to start clinical trial for his recovery. They discuss postponing the wedding, but their friends suggest throwing them a quick wedding in three weeks with the help of strangers and friends while Sol does his treatment. In the midst of planning the wedding, Sol's friend Kyle misses everything because his illness reminds him of losing his dad which he hasn't dealt with. Sol talks to Jenn about having all the side effects of the trial, such as not being able to taste food and that she should just move on with her life. She tells him that she is here with him and he isn't alone. Jenn and Sol get married in front of all their friends and family. After the wedding, Kyle shows up to the reception.

Jenn and Sol get Sol's x-rays and the doctor tells Jen that the cancer has spread to his whole liver and other areas and that she should ask Sol anything she wants because it is time. Jenn and Sol prepare for him to pass soon by writing his eulogy.

Jenn walks to Dave and Kyle's new restaurant/bar, called Now or Never, which was Sol's favorite line. Jenn talks about Sol and his inspiration he had on everyone. Amanda and Megan tell Jenn that it's time for her to open up Sol's gift for their honeymoon which they had been keeping a secret for this moment, after his death. On a flash drive, there is a video of Sol thanking Jenn for loving him during the time they spent together. Jenn says she will live for today for the rest of her life because of Sol.

Cast

 Jessica Rothe as Jennifer "Jenn" Carter
 Harry Shum Jr. as Solomon "Sol" Chau
 Kyle Allen as Kyle Campbell, one of Sol’s best friends
 Chrissie Fit as Amanda Fletcher, one of Jenn's friends
 Jay Pharoah as Dave Berger, one of Sol’s best friends
 Marielle Scott as Megan Denhoff, one of Jenn's best friends
 Molly Hagan as Hope, Jen's Mom 
 Joseph Poliquin Brian, Chemo Patient
 Keala Settle as Viv Lawrence, a barista
 Michael Masini as Peter Ohl
 Greg Vrotsos as Chef Neil Snider
 Ever Carradine as Gigi Carter
 Mario Cantone as Jerome Patterson, a wedding venue manager
 Josh Brener as Eric Bronitt
 Anjali Bhimani as Mina White
 Jon Rudnitsky as Chris, a bartender
 Dan Butler as Dr. Alan Mendelson
 Lulu Cheri as Prep Chef

Production
The film was announced in August 2017, with Universal Pictures distributing a script written by Todd Rosenberg.  In December 2017, the film was revealed to be on that year's "Black List" of most-liked unproduced screenplays. In July 2018, it was announced Marc Meyers would direct the film. Jessica Rothe was cast that September, and Harry Shum Jr. joined the cast the following month. Michael Masini, Chrissie Fit, Greg Vrotsos, Jay Pharoah, Marielle Scott, Kyle Allen, Mario Cantone, Keala Settle, and Ever Carradine later filled out the rest of the main cast. In December 2019, Josh Brener and Jon Rudnitsky joined the cast of the film.

Principal photography took place in New Orleans from October 31 to December 20, 2019.

Release 
All My Life was theatrically released in the United States on December 4, 2020, by Universal Pictures, followed by a video-on-demand release on December 23. It was released in the United Kingdom on October 23, 2020.

Reception

Box office and VOD 
The film grossed $370,315 from 970 theaters in its opening weekend, finishing fourth at the box office. In its sophomore weekend it fell 42% to $215,000. Upon being released to digital rental platforms, the film eighth-most rented title on FandangoNow.

Critical response 
On review aggregator Rotten Tomatoes, the film holds an approval rating of 57% based on 46 reviews, with an average rating of 5.1/10. The website's critics consensus reads, "All My Life benefits from some real chemistry between its leads, even if it's undermined by an aggressive reliance on heartstring-tugging sentimentality." According to Metacritic, which sampled nine critics and calculated a weighted average score of 39 out of 100, the film received "generally unfavorable reviews". Audiences polled by CinemaScore gave the film an average grade of "B+" on an A+ to F scale, while PostTrak reported 72% of audience members gave the film a positive score, with 51% saying they would definitely recommend it.

Carlos Aguilar of The A.V. Club gave the film a "D−" and wrote: "All My Life is too passionless to earn even a begrudged sniffle. It's all paint-by-numbers, from the requisite 'screaming inside a car' shot expressing a character's frustrations to the store-bought spontaneity of a couple jumping into a fountain fully clothed."

However, Steve Pond of TheWrap noted that "All My Life is nothing if not pleasant and amiable as it makes its way down the road to heartwarming" and Courtney Howard of Variety wrote "The warmth and touching tenderness of All My Life melts even the coldest of hearts in its quest to deliver happy and sad tears. Unlike the phony, syrupy, and predictably manipulative devices of a Nicholas Sparks romance, this three-hankie weepie holds a surprising amount of heart and hope to accompany all the cathartic crying."

References

External links
 
 
 

2020 romantic drama films
American films based on actual events
American romantic drama films
Drama films based on actual events
Films about cancer in the United States
Films about couples
Films about death
Romance films based on actual events
Universal Pictures films
Films directed by Marc Meyers
Films shot in New Orleans
2020s English-language films
2020s American films